The Federation of Korean Trade Unions (FKTU) is a national trade union center in South Korea formed in 1960. It represents the company union tendency of the South Korean labour movement, as opposed to the more militant Korean Confederation of Trade Unions (KCTU).

After the May 16 coup in 1961, the Park Chung-hee regime dissolved the General Federation of Korean Trade Unions and its affiliates. The FKTU was placed under the guidance of the military authorities.

The FKTU was the sole legal trade union center in South Korea until the KCTU was finally recognized in November 1999. The Korean Government previously considered the KCTU as a terrorist organisation.

The FKTU is affiliated with the International Trade Union Confederation.

See also 

 1996-1997 strikes in South Korea
 Politics of South Korea
 Economy of South Korea
 Trade unions in South Korea

References

External links 
 

National trade union centers of South Korea
International Trade Union Confederation
Trade unions established in 1960
1960 establishments in South Korea
Organizations based in Seoul